Florian Mayer won in the final of first edition of this tournament. He defeated Danai Udomchoke 7–5, 6–2.

Seeds

Draw

Final four

Top half

Bottom half

External links
 Main Draw
 Qualifying Draw

Singles
SAT Bangkok Open - Singles
 in Thai tennis